The Awarai (Warray) are an indigenous Australian people of the Northern Territory.

Language
The Norwegian explorer Knut Dahl wrote down a short list of vocabulary of the Awarai language.

Country
Their northern boundary was 46 miles south of Darwin, on the Darwin River near the Adelaide–Darwin railway line and 10 miles north of Rum Jungle. The southern limits were at Brocks Creek, where their border met that of the Awinmul.

Social organization
The Warai had arrangements to supply the Wogait with women for marriage.

People
According to Norman Tindale, they stood in fear of the Agigondin horde of the Wulwulam, which however incorporated them eventually as a subtribe.

Alternative names
 Awarrai, Awarra
 Warai, Warei, Warrai

Source:

Some words
 nguk  (1) tobacco (2) shit.

Notes

Citations

Sources

Aboriginal peoples of the Northern Territory